Contemporary Records was a jazz record company and label founded by Lester Koenig in Los Angeles in 1951. Contemporary produced music from a variety of jazz styles and players.

West Coast players
Contemporary became identified with a style of jazz called West Coast jazz as exemplified by Art Pepper, Chet Baker, Shelly Manne, and André Previn.

In the mid 1960s the company fell into relative limbo, but limited new recordings were made in the late 1970s, including a series of albums by Art Pepper recorded at the Village Vanguard club in New York. After Les Koenig's death in 1977, the label was run for seven years by his son, John, who produced albums by George Cables, Joe Farrell, Joe Henderson, Bobby Hutcherson, Peter Erskine, and Chico Freeman.

In 1984 Contemporary was purchased by Fantasy Records, which used the name for a short time. Most Contemporary titles were reissued by Fantasy. Also, some titles have found new life among today's audiophiles as high-quality LP remasters from Analogue Productions and other audiophile labels. The Fantasy catalog, including Contemporary and its associated labels, Good Time Jazz Records, Society for Forgotten Music, and Contemporary Composers Series, was sold to Concord Records in 2004.

Over the years, a number of major figures in the music business worked for Contemporary. Among them were Atlantic Records executive Nesuhi Ertegun, writers Nat Hentoff and Leonard Feather, producer Joe Boyd, recording engineer and studio designer Howard Holzer, and mastering engineer Bernie Grundman.

Recording
Koenig maintained high audio standards. He hired Roy DuNann from Capitol Records in 1956, who, out of the label's shipping room turned studio, turned out some of the best sounding records of the time. DuNann provided some details of his techniques in a Stereophile article nearly 50 years later. He said Koenig provided him with German (Neumann/Telefunken U-47) and Austrian (AKG C-12) condenser microphones and he immediately noted the very high output of these microphones, especially close-in on jazz musicians' dynamic playing. DuNann achieved his signature sound—crisp, clear and balanced without distortion or unpleasant "peak presence"—by keeping his microphone setups very simple (generally one per musician) and avoided the use of pre-amplifiers for them.

He built a simple passive mixing system that directly fed the electronics of his Ampex 350 and 351 tape machines. Also, DuNann told Stereophile that Contemporary sessions were recorded "dry" (without electronic echo added or in a reverberant room). Sometimes, such as in the case of Sonny Rollins' Way Out West, a plate reverb unit was inserted between the tape machine and the LP disc cutting lathe. This is why some later LP and CD reissues of Contemporary albums sound "dry" and "dead" compared to the original LPs mastered by DuNann.

Discography

Contemporary 3500/7500 series
The 3500 (mono)/7500 (stereo) series of 12 inch LP records commenced in 1955 and ran until 1961. Contemporary was the first jazz label to record albums in stereo from 1956.

Contemporary Popular 5000/9000 series
The 5000 (mono)/9000 (stereo) series of 12 inch LP records commenced in 1956 and ran until 1962.

Contemporary 3600/7600 series
The 3600 (mono)/7600 (stereo) series of 12 inch LP records commenced in 1962 and ran until around the early 1980s. After 3624 all releases were stereo only.

14000 series
The 14000 series began in 1980 with 12 inch LP records and in 1982 commenced releases on compact disc. After 1992 all releases were CD only.

See also 
List of record labels

References

External links 
Conrad, Thomas. "The Search for Roy DuNann" (April 2002; Stereophile Web site)
Contemporary Records Listing
Lester Koenig, Contemporary Records, Shelly Manne, AKG

Defunct record labels of the United States
Jazz record labels
Record labels established in 1951
1951 establishments in California